The men's road race at the 2001 UCI Road World Championships was the 68th edition of the event. The race took place on Sunday 14 October 2001 in Lisbon, Portugal on a  circuit. The race was won by Óscar Freire of Spain.

Final classification

References

Men's Road Race
UCI Road World Championships – Men's road race